Aleksey Reunkov is a Russian long-distance runner. At the 2012 Summer Olympics, he competed in the Men's marathon, finishing in 14th place. He also took part in the 2015 London Marathon, finishing in 10th overall.

References

1984 births
Living people
Russian male long-distance runners
Russian male marathon runners
Olympic male marathon runners
Olympic athletes of Russia
Athletes (track and field) at the 2012 Summer Olympics
World Athletics Championships athletes for Russia
European Athletics Championships medalists
Russian Athletics Championships winners